"Roog" is a science fiction short story by American writer Philip K. Dick. It was his first sold work, although not his first published story.

Plot summary
"Roog" is a story told from the point of view of a dog named Boris, who observes his masters carefully storing food in containers outside of their house day after day. Unbeknownst to the dog, these are the human's trash cans for garbage. The dog is later horrified to witness some food being 'stolen' by garbagemen who the dog believes are predatory carnivores from another planet. The dog comes to know these beings as 'Roogs', and tries to warn his master of each 'theft' with cries of 'Roog!' 'Roog!'. The humans, unable to comprehend the hound's message, think the dog is just being rowdy. Thus they attribute the sound the dog makes to be the sound that all dogs make when they are excited: 'Roog!' 'Roog!' The tale concludes with the animal being somewhat distraught, barking "ROOG!" very loudly at the garbagemen before they make off once more with trash in their garbage truck.

Publication 
"Roog" was written in November 1951 and appeared in The Magazine of Fantasy & Science Fiction (February 1953, page 123) without illustration. During this time Dick worked in a record store. In an essay prefacing a collection of his short stories published in 1978, Dick recalled the story's gestation, as well as discussing its plot, its general themes and his reaction at the time. Dick relates that he contacted Anthony Boucher, a sci-fi/fantasy publisher, editor and fellow writer whom Dick recalls as a kind friend. Dick wrote, "Without [Boucher's] help I'd still be in the record business. I mean that very seriously."  As a young man, Dick was very pleased with the publication, and wondered if he could quit his job at the record store and work full-time as an author, while the older Dick (27 years on) dismissed that aspiration as delusional.

Soon after "Roog"'s original publication, Boucher attempted to get it published once more, in a science fiction anthology being compiled by a person Dick refers to as "Ms. J.M." (Judith Merrill Interview with Lupoff). However, she disliked the story, finding it obscure and hard to understand. She also criticized Dick's description of the garbagemen as inaccurate, apparently unable to see that the description is from the protagonist dog's perspective. Despite Dick explaining the story in a letter to J.M. regarding the themes of the work, she rejected the story. Boucher, however, proceeded to publish it, and it remains in print today, at one time even appearing in a high school literature textbook.

Reception 
Dick regarded Roog as "quite a serious story". Dick explained in the introduction to The Collected Stories of Philip K. Dick that "Roog" "tells of fear, it tells of loyalty, it tells of obscure menace and a good creature who cannot convey knowledge of that menace to those he loves".
Furthermore Aaron Barlow suggests an insightful connection of the story to the nature and themes of his writings:

Trivia 
 The dog in "Roog", Boris, was based upon a real dog called Snooper, who belonged to a neighbor of Dick. Snooper became very alarmed every time the garbagemen arrived to pick up trash, and this inspired Dick to write the short story.

References

External links 
 The full text of Roog on Google Books
 
 1971 Interview With Philip K. Dick about Roog

Short stories by Philip K. Dick
1953 short stories
Works originally published in The Magazine of Fantasy & Science Fiction
Dogs in literature